The Women's 1500 metres event  at the 2004 IAAF World Indoor Championships was held on March 5–6.

Medalists

Results

Heat
First 3 of each heat (Q) and next 3 fastest (q) qualified for the semifinals.

Final

References
Results

1500
1500 metres at the World Athletics Indoor Championships
2004 in women's athletics